was a Japanese martial artist.  He was a member of the 1932 Japanese Olympic wrestling team.  He was one of the highest-ranked judoka, and was awarded a 10th dan in April 1984 by the Kodokan. He was for a long time the oldest 10th dan until Ichiro Abe was awarded the rank age of 83 years. Kotani studied at the Tokyo College of Education and studied judo directly under Jigoro Kano. As a young man, he was known to take on any challenges. Kotani was very active in promoting judo throughout the world and was the director of the international division at the Kodokan for many years. He was also a professor at Tokai University. He was the Kodokan's top representative and vice president of the All Japan Judo Federation. He died on October 19, 1991.

References

External links
 
 judoinfo.com Profiles of Kodokan 10th Dan Holders

Japanese male sport wrestlers
1903 births
1991 deaths
Olympic wrestlers of Japan
Wrestlers at the 1932 Summer Olympics
Academic staff of Tokai University
Kodokan 10th dans
20th-century Japanese people